Capitani is a surname. Notable people with the surname include:

 Alice Capitani (born 1984), Italian gymnast
 Giorgio Capitani (1927–2017), Italian film director and screenwriter
 Ignacio Capitani (born 1987), Argentine footballer
 Otello Capitani (1890–1912), Italian gymnast
 Remo Capitani (1927–2014), Italian actor

See also
 Capitani (TV series)

Italian-language surnames